Yellow weaver may refer to:

 Yellow weaver (fish) – A sandperch, a marine fish in the genus Parapercis from New Zealand.
 Eastern golden weaver – Bird in the family Ploceidae from eastern and southern Africa
 Finn's weaver– A species of weaver bird found in the Ganges and Brahmaputra valleys in India and Nepal

Animal common name disambiguation pages